Paratropeza is a genus of parasitic flies in the family Tachinidae. There are about 10 described species in Paratropeza.

Species
These 10 species belong to the genus Paratropeza:
 Paratropeza atra Paramonov, 1964
 Paratropeza brandti Paramonov, 1964
 Paratropeza flavibasis Paramonov, 1964
 Paratropeza flavitibia Alexander
 Paratropeza hyalipennis Alexander
 Paratropeza lorentzi Paramonov, 1964
 Paratropeza nuda Paramonov, 1964
 Paratropeza papuana Paramonov, 1964
 Paratropeza shirakii Alexander
 Paratropeza xystophanes Alexander

References

Further reading

 
 
 
 

Tachinidae
Articles created by Qbugbot